The former Hartin's Hotel, currently the East India Company Restaurant and Conference Hall, is a historic building in the Bells Corners neighbourhood of Ottawa, Ontario, Canada.

History 
The two-storey building has a symmetrical facade, with a side gable roof, dressed limestone construction with decorative stone quoins and voussoirs. 

It was constructed circa 1870 on the north side of what is now known as Robertson Road, at the intersection with Old Richmond Road.  The two-storey stone building is the oldest building in Bells Corners and was constructed shortly after the Carleton County Fire of 1870 destroyed the earlier building on the site.  David Hartin had acquired the former Malcomson's Tavern on 23 July 1870.  The original building was destroyed by fire in August the same year.  He subsequently rebuilt a larger stone structure on the site in 1871 and named it Hartin's Hotel.  It still stands today as the home of the East India Company restaurant and conference centre.  In November 2014 it was designated a heritage building by Ottawa City Council.

See also 
List of designated heritage properties in Ottawa

References

Designated heritage properties in Ottawa
Hotel buildings completed in 1871